Phrynomedusa bokermanni, Bokermann's leaf frog, is a species of frog in the subfamily Phyllomedusinae.
It is endemic to Brazil. Its natural habitats are subtropical or tropical moist lowland forests and rivers.

References

Phrynomedusa
Endemic fauna of Brazil
Amphibians described in 1991
Taxonomy articles created by Polbot